The following is a partial list of currently operating hospitals in Scotland.

NHS hospitals in Scotland
Organised by NHS board areas, see NHS National Services Scotland and Subdivisions of Scotland.

Ayrshire and Arran
East Ayrshire, North Ayrshire and South Ayrshire

East Ayrshire
East Ayrshire Community Hospital, Cumnock
Kirklandside Hospital, Hurlford
University Hospital Crosshouse, Crosshouse, Kilmarnock

North Ayrshire
Arran War Memorial Hospital, Lamlash, Isle of Arran
Ayrshire Central Hospital, Irvine
Brooksby House Hospital, Largs
Lady Margaret Hospital, Millport, Isle of Cumbrae
Woodland View, Irvine

South Ayrshire
Ailsa Hospital, Ayr
Biggart Hospital, Prestwick
Girvan Community Hospital, Girvan
University Hospital Ayr

Borders
Borders General Hospital, Melrose
Hawick Community Hospital, Hawick
Hay Lodge Hospital, Peebles
Kelso Hospital, Kelso
Knoll Hospital, Duns

Dumfries and Galloway

Within Dumfries
Dumfries and Galloway Royal Infirmary
Midpark Hospital

Outwith Dumfries
Annan Hospital, Annan
Castle Douglas Hospital, Castle Douglas
Galloway Community Hospital, Stranraer
Kirkcudbright Hospital, Kirkcudbright
Lochmaben Hospital, Lochmaben
Moffat Hospital, Moffat
Newton Stewart Hospital, Newton Stewart
Thomas Hope Hospital, Langholm
Thornhill Hospital, Thornhill

Fife
Adamson Hospital, Cupar
Cameron Hospital, Windygates
Glenrothes Hospital, Glenrothes
Lynebank Hospital, Dunfermline
Queen Margaret Hospital, Dunfermline
Randolph Wemyss Memorial Hospital, Buckhaven
St Andrews Community Hospital, St Andrews
Stratheden Hospital, Springfield (Cupar)
Victoria Hospital, Kirkcaldy
Whyteman's Brae Hospital, Kirkcaldy

Forth Valley
Clackmannanshire, Falkirk and Stirling

Clackmannanshire

Falkirk

Within Falkirk
Falkirk Community Hospital

Outwith Falkirk
Bellsdyke Hospital, Larbert
Bo'ness Hospital, Bo'ness
Forth Valley Royal Hospital, Larbert

Stirling

Stirling Health and Care Village

Grampian
Aberdeenshire, City of Aberdeen and Moray

City of Aberdeen
Aberdeen Community Health and Care Village
Aberdeen Maternity Hospital
Aberdeen Royal Infirmary 
City Hospital
Roxburghe House
Royal Aberdeen Children's Hospital
Royal Cornhill Hospital
Woodend Hospital

Aberdeenshire
Aboyne Hospital
Chalmers Hospital, Banff
Fraserburgh Hospital
Glen o' Dee Hospital, Banchory
Insch War Memorial Hospital
Inverurie Hospital
Jubilee Hospital, Huntly
Kincardine Community Hospital, Stonehaven
Peterhead Community Hospital
Turriff Hospital
Ugie Hospital, Peterhead

Moray
Dr Gray's Hospital, Elgin
Fleming Cottage Hospital, Aberlour
Leanchoil Hospital, Forres
Seafield Hospital, Buckie
Stephen Cottage Hospital, Dufftown
The Oaks, Elgin
Turner Memorial Hospital, Keith

Greater Glasgow and Clyde
Argyll and Bute, Inverclyde, City of Glasgow, East Dunbartonshire, West Dunbartonshire,  Renfrewshire, and East Renfrewshire. Together with parts of South Lanarkshire and North Lanarkshire.

Inverclyde
Inverclyde Royal Hospital, Greenock

City of Glasgow
Beatson West of Scotland Cancer Centre
Gartnavel General Hospital
Gartnavel Royal Hospital
Glasgow Dental Hospital and School
Glasgow Royal Infirmary
Leverndale Hospital
Lightburn Hospital
NHS Centre for Integrative Care
Princess Royal Maternity Hospital
Royal Hospital for Children, Glasgow
Stobhill Hospital
New Victoria Hospital
Queen Elizabeth University Hospital
West Glasgow Ambulatory Care Hospital

East Dunbartonshire

West Dunbartonshire
Dumbarton Joint Hospital
Vale of Leven Hospital, Alexandria

Renfrewshire
Dykebar Hospital, Paisley
Royal Alexandra Hospital, Paisley

Highland

Argyll and Bute

Argyll and Bute Hospital, Lochgilphead
Campbeltown Hospital, Campbeltown
Cowal Community Hospital
Islay Hospital, Bowmore, Isle of Islay
Lorn and Islands Hospital, Oban
Mid Argyll Community Hospital, Lochgilphead
Mull and Iona Community Hospital, Isle of Mull
Victoria Hospital, Rothesay
Victoria Integrated Care Centre, Helensburgh

Badenoch and Strathspey
Ian Charles Community Hospital, Grantown-on-Spey
St Vincent's Hospital, Kingussie

Caithness
Caithness General Hospital, Wick
Dunbar Hospital, Thurso
Wick Town and County Hospital, Wick

Inverness
New Craigs Psychiatric Hospital, Inverness
Raigmore Hospital, Inverness
RNI Community Hospital, Inverness

Lochaber
Belford Hospital, Fort William

Nairnshire
Nairn Town and County Hospital, Nairn

Ross-shire
County Community Hospital, Invergordon
Ross Memorial Hospital, Dingwall

Skye
Mackinnon Memorial Hospital, Broadford, Isle of Skye
Portree Hospital, Isle of Skye

Sutherland
Lawson Memorial Hospital, Golspie
Migdale Hospital, Bonar Bridge

Lanarkshire
The majority of North Lanarkshire and South Lanarkshire

North Lanarkshire
Cleland Hospital, Cleland
Coathill Hospital, Coatbridge
Kilsyth Victoria Cottage Hospital, Kilsyth
University Hospital Monklands, Airdrie
University Hospital Wishaw, Wishaw
Wester Moffat Hospital, Airdrie

South Lanarkshire
Kello Hospital, Biggar
Kirklands Hospital, Bothwell
Lady Home Hospital, Douglas 
Stonehouse Hospital
Udston Hospital, Hamilton
University Hospital Hairmyres, East Kilbride

Lothian
City of Edinburgh, East Lothian, Midlothian and West Lothian

City of Edinburgh
Astley Ainslie Hospital, Edinburgh
Chalmers Hospital, Edinburgh
Corstorphine Hospital
Edinburgh Dental Institute
Lauriston Building
Leith Community Treatment Centre
Liberton Hospital
Princess Alexandra Eye Pavilion
Royal Edinburgh Hospital
Royal Hospital for Children and Young People (Edinburgh)
Royal Infirmary of Edinburgh at Little France
Royal Victoria Hospital (Edinburgh)
Western General Hospital

East Lothian
Belhaven Hospital, Dunbar
Edington Cottage Hospital, North Berwick
East Lothian Community Hospital, Haddington

Midlothian
Midlothian Community Hospital

West Lothian
St John's Hospital, Livingston
St Michael's Hospital, Linlithgow
Tippethill House Hospital, Whitburn

Orkney
Balfour Hospital, Kirkwall

Shetland
Gilbert Bain Hospital, Lerwick
Montfield Hospital, Lerwick

Tayside
Angus, City of Dundee and Perth and Kinross

Angus
Arbroath Infirmary
Stracathro Hospital, Brechin
Whitehills Hospital, Forfar

City of Dundee

Within Dundee
Carseview Centre
Dundee Dental Hospital
King's Cross Hospital
Ninewells Hospital
Royal Victoria Hospital
Tayside Children's Hospital

Outwith Dundee

Perth and Kinross

Within Perth
Murray Royal Hospital
Perth Royal Infirmary

Outwith Perth
Blairgowrie Community Hospital
Crieff Community Hospital
Pitlochry Community Hospital
St Margaret's Hospital, Auchterarder

Western Isles
St Brendan's Hospital, Castlebay, Isle of Barra
Uist and Barra Hospital, Balivanich, Isle of Benbecula
Western Isles Hospital, Stornoway, Isle of Lewis

Others
The following NHS hospitals are classed as Special NHS Boards, and serve the whole of Scotland.

South Lanarkshire
State Hospital, Carstairs

West Dunbartonshire
Golden Jubilee University National Hospital, Clydebank

Private hospitals in Scotland

General Hospitals

Albyn Hospital, Aberdeen
Carrick Glen Hospital, Ayr, South Ayrshire
Fernbrae Hospital, Dundee
Kings Park Hospital, Stirling
Murrayfield Hospital, Edinburgh
Nuffield Health Glasgow Hospital, Glasgow
Nuffield Health Edinburgh Hospital, Edinburgh
Ross Hall Hospital, Glasgow
Boye Hall Clinic, Edinburgh

Psychiatric Hospitals

Alexander Clinic, Oldmeldrum, Aberdeenshire
Castle Craig Hospital, Peebles
Graham Anderson House, Glasgow
Huntercombe Hospital - Edinburgh, Uphall, West Lothian
Monroe House, Dundee
Partnerships in Care Ayr Clinic, Ayr
Priory Hospital Glasgow, Glasgow
Surehaven Glasgow Hospital, Glasgow

Other Specialist Services

Murdostoun Castle, Wishaw Specializes in the rehabilitation of patients with acquired brain injury.
Scottish Epilepsy Centre, Glasgow Specializes in the treatment of epilepsy, epilepsy associated conditions and sleep disorders.

References

Scotland
 
Hospitals